Captain Mark Anthony Peter Phillips  (born 22 September 1948) is an English Olympic gold medal-winning horseman for Great Britain and the first husband of Anne, Princess Royal, with whom he has two children. He remains a leading figure in British equestrian circles, a noted eventing course designer, and a columnist for Horse & Hound magazine.

Family background and early life
Mark Anthony Peter Phillips was born on 22 September 1948. He is the son of Major Peter William Garside Phillips, MC (1920–1998) and Anne Patricia Phillips (née Tiarks; 1926–1988); they married in 1946. Anne was educated at Downe House and served in the Women's Royal Naval Service during the Second World War. Her father John Gerhard Edward Tiarks (1896–1962), who served in the First and Second World Wars, attained the rank of Brigadier. John Tiarks was aide-de-camp to King George VI from 1947 to 1950. Mark had a younger sister, Sarah Anne Staples (née Phillips; 1951–2014).

Phillips was educated at Stouts Hill Preparatory School near Uley, Gloucestershire, then at Marlborough College, then the Royal Military Academy Sandhurst.

Military career
Upon passing out from Sandhurst, Phillips was commissioned as a Second Lieutenant into the 1st The Queen's Dragoon Guards in July 1969, He was promoted to Lieutenant in January 1971. By the time of his wedding to Princess Anne in November 1973, Phillips was an acting Captain. In January 1974, he was appointed a Personal aide-de-camp to Queen Elizabeth II. Phillips was substantively promoted to captain in July 1975, and retired from the Army on 30 March 1978.

Phillips continued to style himself Captain Mark Phillips, as it is usual for retired cavalry captains to keep using their rank if their civilian job involves working with horses in racing or equestrian sports.

Equestrian career

Phillips was a reserve member of the British equestrian team for the 1968 Olympics. He was part of the British three-day event teams that won a world title in 1970, a European title in 1971, and Olympic gold medals in 1972; individually, he finished in 35th place in 1972. At the 1988 Olympics, his horse sustained a pulled muscle and could not complete the individual three-day event, but Phillips won a silver medal with the British team. Phillips was a four-time champion at the Badminton Horse Trials, in 1971 and 1972 on Great Ovation, in 1974 on Colombus, and in 1981 on Lincoln. It was through his equestrian activities that he met Princess Anne, the only daughter of Queen Elizabeth II and Prince Philip, Duke of Edinburgh, whom he married. Their own daughter Zara later won a silver medal in the three-day event with the British team at the 2012 Olympics.

In 1998 Phillips designed the cross-country venue for the Red Hills Horse Trials, a qualifying event for the Olympics located in Tallahassee, Florida, United States. He is now a regular columnist for Horse & Hound magazine. He also remains a leading figure in British equestrian circles and serves as Chef d'Equipe of the United States Eventing Team.

Personal life

Phillips first met his future wife Princess Anne at a party for horse lovers in 1968. They married on 14 November 1973, at Westminster Abbey. They have two children: Peter (born 1977) and Zara (born 1981). It is believed that Phillips declined a peerage from the Queen, which would have allowed his children to use courtesy titles. The Queen bought Gatcombe Park, near Minchinhampton, for the couple as a wedding present.

In August 1989 the Princess Royal and Phillips announced their intention to separate, as the marriage had been under strain for a number of years. The couple had rarely been seen in public together, and both were romantically linked with other people. They continued to share the custody of their children, and initially announced that "there were no plans for divorce." Meanwhile, Phillips continued to work at the couple's estate at Gatcombe Park. In 1991, a DNA test confirmed that Phillips had fathered a girl, Felicity Tonkin, born in August 1985 in New Zealand to art teacher Heather Tonkin. Phillips and Princess Anne divorced on 23 April 1992.

On 1 February 1997, Phillips married Sandy Pflueger, an American Olympic dressage rider. Their daughter Stephanie was born on 2 October 1997. She grew up at Aston Farm, Gatcombe Park, close to the family of Princess Anne, and served as a bridesmaid at the wedding of her half-sister Zara Tindall.

On 3 May 2012, it was confirmed by Phillips' solicitors that Phillips and Pflueger had separated, intending to divorce, with Phillips becoming involved with American equestrian Lauren Hough.

Phillips' personal wealth is thought to be around £15–20 million. The settlement he received when his marriage to Princess Anne ended was described as "modest" and reported to be around "$3 million".

Honours and arms

Military ranks

  Captain (Retired), late Queen's Dragoon Guards

Honours

British honours

 15 August 1974: Commander of the Royal Victorian Order (CVO)
 6 February 1977: Queen Elizabeth II Silver Jubilee Medal
 6 February 2002: Queen Elizabeth II Golden Jubilee Medal
 6 February 2012: Queen Elizabeth II Diamond Jubilee Medal
 6 February 2022: Queen Elizabeth II Platinum Jubilee Medal

Honorary military appointments
 1 January 1974: Personal Aide-de-Camp to the Queen (ADC)

Foreign honours
  Norway: Commander with Star of The Royal Norwegian Order of Saint Olav, 13 April 1988.

Arms

Issue
By Princess Anne

By Heather Tonkin

By Sandy Pflueger

References

External links 

 
 
 
 

1948 births
Living people
1st The Queen's Dragoon Guards officers
Anne, Princess Royal
Commanders of the Royal Victorian Order
British event riders
British male equestrians
English Olympic medallists
Equestrians at the 1972 Summer Olympics
Equestrians at the 1988 Summer Olympics
Graduates of the Royal Military Academy Sandhurst
Medalists at the 1988 Summer Olympics
Medalists at the 1972 Summer Olympics
Olympic equestrians of Great Britain
Olympic gold medallists for Great Britain
Olympic medalists in equestrian
Olympic silver medallists for Great Britain
People educated at Marlborough College
People from Tetbury
Sportspeople from Gloucestershire